This is the results breakdown of the local elections held in Castilla–La Mancha on 10 June 1987. The following tables show detailed results in the autonomous community's most populous municipalities, sorted alphabetically.

Overall

City control
The following table lists party control in the most populous municipalities, including provincial capitals (shown in bold). Gains for a party are displayed with the cell's background shaded in that party's colour.

Municipalities

Albacete
Population: 126,110

Ciudad Real
Population: 54,409

Cuenca
Population: 41,034

Guadalajara
Population: 59,080

Talavera de la Reina
Population: 67,311

Toledo
Population: 58,198

See also
1987 Castilian-Manchegan regional election

References

Castilla-La Mancha
1987